Modupe Omo-Eboh (1922 – 25 February 2002) was a Nigerian lawyer and jurist who was the country's first female judge.

Early life and education
Modupe Akingbehin was born in Lagos State in 1922. Her mother was a granddaughter of the Lagos aristocrat Oshodi Tapa and a great granddaughter of Bishop Samuel Ajayi Crowther, who was himself a descendant of King Abiodun of Oyo. The nationalist Herbert Macaulay was her maternal great-uncle. She attended Queen's College, Lagos before studying law in London.

Career
Omo-Eboh was called to the English bar at Lincoln's Inn on 14 March 1953. She worked as a lawyer, Magistrate, Chief Magistrate, Administrator-General and Public Trustee, Director of Public Prosecutions and Acting Solicitor-General before she became a judge in Benin City on Thursday 13 November 1969, the first woman appointed to the High Courts of Nigeria. In 1976, she was appointed to the Lagos judiciary.

Omo-Eboh died on 25 February 2002.

There is a Justice Modupe Omo-Eboh Street in Lagos named after her.

Personal life
Omo-Eboh's husband was a Justice of the Court of Appeal from Edo State.

See also
List of first women lawyers and judges in Africa

References

1922 births
2002 deaths
People from Lagos State
Nigerian women lawyers
Nigerian women judges
20th-century women lawyers
Nigerian expatriates in the United Kingdom
Abiodun family
Queen's College, Lagos alumni
Yoruba women lawyers
20th-century Nigerian lawyers
Lagos State judges
History of women in Nigeria
20th-century Nigerian women